John Griffith may refer to:

Clergymen and monks 
John Griffith (Baptist minister) (1622?–1700), English General Baptist minister
John Griffith (monk) (fl. 1553), Welsh præmonstratensian and Cistercian monk
John Griffith (priest) (1818/19–1885), Anglican priest in south Wales
John Griffith (Rev.Dr.) (1789 -1879), academic and clergyman
John Jones (martyr) (died 1598), also known as John Griffith

Musicians 
John Thomas Griffith (born 1960), American singer-songwriter with the band Cowboy Mouth
Johnny Griffith (musician) (1936–2002), African-American musician

Pilots 
John H. Griffith (1905–2011), test pilot
John Sharpe Griffith (1898–1974), American First World War flying ace

Politicians 
John Griffith (died 1580), MP for Flintshire
John Griffith (of Plas Mawr) (died 1609), MP for Carnarvon 1571, 1572 and 1604
John Griffith (of Llyn), MP for Carnarvonshire 1640
John Griffith (MP for Beaumaris) (1591–1642), Welsh politician
John Griffith (MP for Caernarvon) (1662–1687), MP for Carnarvon 1685
John Griffith (MP for Chester), represented Chester
John Griffith (1687–1739), Welsh MP for Caernarvonshire
John Wynne Griffith (1763–1834), MP for Denbigh
John Griffith (Governor of Bombay), Governor of Bombay, 1795
John K. Griffith (1882–1942), U.S. Representative from Louisiana

Sportsmen 
John G. Griffith (1880–1948), American football, basketball, and baseball coach at University of Idaho, University of Iowa, Oklahoma A&M University, New Mexico A&M
John L. Griffith (1877–1944), American football, basketball, baseball, and track athlete, coach, and college athletics administrator, first commissioner of the Big Ten Conference
Johnny Griffith (coach) (1924–2003), American football coach at South Georgia College and the University of Georgia

Other people
John Griffith (engineer) (1848–1938), Irish civil engineer
John Stanley Griffith (1928–1972), British chemist and biophysicist
John Griffith (journalist) (1821–1877), Welsh language journalist
J. A. G. Griffith (1918–2010), Welsh legal scholar
John Norton-Griffiths (1871–1930),  British Army officer during the Second Boer War and the First World War, and a Member of Parliament.
John V. Griffith (born 1947), former president of Presbyterian College and Lyon College
John William Griffith (1789–1855), English architect and surveyor

See also
Griffith John (1831–1912), Welsh Christian missionary to China